Music City Queen was a replica showboat formerly operating for entertainment purposes on the Cumberland River in the southern United States.  It was the smaller of two stern-wheel paddle steamers based at Opry Mills in Nashville, Tennessee; the other is the General Jackson.

Transportation in Nashville, Tennessee
Paddle steamers of the United States
Tourist attractions in Nashville, Tennessee